Gunnar Larsen (1902–1973) was a Danish chemical engineer, businessman and politician. He served as the minister for transport between 1940 and 1943. He left Denmark in 1954 and exiled into Ireland where he lived until his death.

Biography
Larsen was born on 10 January 1902. He was an engineer by profession and graduated from the Massachusetts Institute of Technology obtaining a degree in chemical engineering in 1926. He was named as the director of FL Smidth & Co. in 1935 becoming a prominent figure in the Danish industry. Larsen replaced his father as the director of the company. Larsen was one of the confidantes of Danish politician Erik Scavenius. He resigned from the company on 8 July 1940 when he was appointed minister of transport. He was part of the coalition government and the first Buhl cabinet which ceased to function on 29 August 1943. He served in the cabinets as an independent politician. 

Following the end of his tenure as minister he developed an alliance with the British intelligence service and supported the resistance movement financially. After World War II Larsen was arrested in 1945 and the Copenhagen City Court sentenced him to prison for providing financial support to a gun brush factory. He was acquitted by the High Court and the Supreme Court in 1948. In 1954 he left Denmark and settled in Ireland. He became a citizen of Ireland and involved in business. He died in Ireland on 1 February 1973.

Larsen's diaries covering the period between January 1941 and September 1943 were published in 2011.

References

External links

20th-century Danish engineers
20th-century Danish businesspeople
1902 births
1973 deaths
Transport ministers of Denmark
Danish chemical engineers
Danish expatriates in Ireland
Irish people of Danish descent
MIT School of Engineering alumni